Gen Neo (born June 18, 1989), is a Singaporean singer-songwriter, producer and composer based in South Korea, under BAMM Entertainment.

Early life
Gen Neo was born on June 18, 1989 in Singapore. He attended Catholic High School and Victoria Junior College before moving to South Korea to become a producer and composer. Gen attended Berklee College of Music where he met his frequent collaborator and close friend, Henry Lau.

Career
Gen started his music career in South Korea as part of a production team called NoizeBank, consisting of Canadian musician Henry Lau, and producers Isaac Han and Neil Nallas. He has composed and produced for various artists such as Got7, Super Junior-M, Henry Lau, and f(x).

Being vocally-trained and gifted with a unique vocal tone, Gen also made his debut in Korea in 2015 with the single titled "Think About Us" signed under the company Mapps Entertainment. He shortly departed from the company to pursue his own vision and founded his own independent label BAMM. His first mandopop single "Stop Sugar" was released in December 2016 was charted on iTunes Mandopop Charts at number 12 beside veterans JJ Lin and Jay Chou.

Gen was featured in f(x) member Amber Liu's single titled "On My Own". The Korean and English versions were released on May 18, 2016 on SM Entertainment and Liu's YouTube channel respectively. The single charted on Billboard World Digital Song charts at number 11.

In 2017, Gen released his debut EP, Dimensions with a total of 4 tracks in it.

He released another single, "Come With Me" in 2017. He then collaborated with former Miss A member Fei in the single, "Will You Won't You". He released "从今以后" on September 28, 2018 and was featured in Amber Liu's "Right Now". On the December 31, 2019, Gen released the single "Over You".

Influences
Gen has stated that his music is influenced by 90's R&B music and recent acts such as American R&B singer, Drake. Jay Chou, Wang Leehom, David Tao and Khalil Fong were also some of the Mandopop artists that had influenced him.

Discography

Albums

Singles

Collaborations

Videography

Music videos

Television shows

Production credits

References

External links

Gen Neo at BAMM Entertainment
Gen Neo at Monster Entertainment Group

1989 births
Living people
Chinese K-pop singers
Korean-language singers of Singapore
K-pop singers
Singaporean expatriates in South Korea
21st-century Singaporean male singers
Singaporean people of Chinese descent
Catholic High School, Singapore alumni
Victoria Junior College alumni
Berklee College of Music alumni
Singaporean Mandopop singers